One Kings Lane is a luxury home decor business that operates a furniture and home accessories sales website. It was founded by Ali Pincus and Susan Feldman in March 2009. The company was valued at $912 million in 2014. The company has 10 million members and has raised venture capital from Mousse Partners, Kleiner Perkins, and Greylock Partners. Bed Bath & Beyond acquired the business in 2016. The company joined the CSC Generation family of brands in 2020. The company is led by Waqaas Afzal.

References

External links

Retail companies established in 2009
Home decor retailers